Pietro Corvaja (born 19 July 1967 in Padua, Italy) is an Italian mathematician working in Diophantine geometry. He is a professor of geometry at the University of Udine.

Early life and education
Corvaja was born in Padua, Italy on 19 July 1967. He graduated with a scientific high school diploma from a liceo scientifico in 1985, before enrolling in the University of Pisa as a student of the Scuola Normale Superiore di Pisa. He graduated from the Scuola Normale with an undergraduate thesis on the theory of transcendental numbers under the direction of Roberto Dvornicich in 1989.

After a one year scholarship at INdAM from 1989 to 1990, Corvaja completed his PhD under Michel Waldschmidt and Michel Laurent at Pierre and Marie Curie University in 1995. From 1994 to 1995, he was also a research assistant at the Università Iuav di Venezia as a collaborator of Umberto Zannier. In 2001, Corvaja obtained his habilitation qualification at Pierre and Marie Curie University.

Career
In 1995, Corvaja became a researcher at the University of Udine. From 1997 to 1998, he was a member of the Institute for Advanced Study under the direction of Enrico Bombieri. In 2002, Corvaja became an associate professor of algebra at the University of Udine. Since 2005, he has been a professor of geometry at the University of Udine.

Corvaja is the coordinator of the mathematics program and the vice director of the Scuola Superiore (School of Excellence) of the University of Udine.

Research
Corvaja and Zannier gave a new proof of Siegel's theorem on integral points in 2002 by using a new method based on the subspace theorem.

Awards
Corvaja was inducted into the Istituto Veneto di Scienze, Lettere ed Arti on 26 May 2016.

Selected publications
 with J. Noguchi: A new unicity theorem and Erdős' problem for polarized semi-abelian varieties, Math. Ann., vol. 353, no. 2 (2012), pp. 439–464.
 with U. Zannier: A subspace theorem approach to integral points on curves, Compte Rendu Acad. Sci., vol. 334, 2002, pp. 267–271 
 with U. Zannier:  Finiteness of Integral Values for the Ratio of Two Linear Recurrences, Inventiones Mathematicae, vol. 149, 2002, pp. 431–451. 
 with U. Zannier: On Integral Points on Surfaces, Annals of Mathematics, Vol. 160, 2004, pp. 705–726. arXiv preprint
 with U. Zannier: On the rational approximations to the powers of an algebraic number: solution of two problems of Mahler and Mendès France, Acta Mathematica, vol. 193, no. 2, 2004, pp. 175–191. 
 with U. Zannier: Some cases of Vojta's conjecture on integral points over function fields, Journal of Algebraic Geometry, vol. 17, 2008, pp. 295–333. arXiv preprint

References

External links
 
 

20th-century Italian mathematicians
21st-century Italian mathematicians
University of Pisa alumni
Scuola Normale Superiore di Pisa alumni
1967 births
Scientists from Padua
Italian algebraic geometers
Arithmetic geometers
Living people
Academic staff of the University of Udine